Jocelyn Joseph Hardy (December 5, 1945 – February 19, 2021) was a Canadian professional ice hockey player who played 210 games in the World Hockey Association and 63 games in the National Hockey League. He played for the  Chicago Cougars, California Golden Seals, Cleveland Crusaders, San Diego Mariners, and Indianapolis Racers. He died as result of complications from a heart attack on February 19, 2021, at the age of 75.

After leaving the WHA, Hardy became a player-coach with the Beauce Jaros of the North American Hockey League. Hardy was the league's top scorer and most valuable player during the 1975–76 season. During that season he became the first professional player to score over 200 points in a season, finishing with 208.

Subsequent coaching duties included the Binghamton Dusters, Shawinigan Cataractes, and Beauport Harfangs.

Career statistics

Regular season and playoffs

References

External links

1945 births
2021 deaths
Beauce Jaros players
Beauport Harfangs coaches
Binghamton Dusters players
California Golden Seals players
Canadian ice hockey centres
Canadian ice hockey coaches
Chicago Cougars players
Cleveland Crusaders players
Ice hockey people from Quebec
Ice hockey player-coaches
Indianapolis Racers players
Long Island Cougars players
New Haven Blades players
North American Hockey League (1973–1977) coaches
Nova Scotia Voyageurs players
Oakland Seals players
Providence Reds players
San Diego Mariners players
Seattle Totems (WHL) players
Shawinigan Cataractes coaches
Sportspeople from Saguenay, Quebec
Place of death missing